Parvoscincus palawanensis  is a species of skink found in the Philippines.

References

Parvoscincus
Reptiles described in 1961
Taxa named by Walter Creighton Brown
Taxa named by Angel Chua Alcala